Julius von Voss (24 August 1768, Brandenburg an der Havel, Prussia – 1 November 1832 Berlin) was a German author.

Works
His rapidity of literary production was almost without a parallel. His best story is The Schildbürger (The Fooltownite: 1823). He wrote a great many comedies, farces, and satirical parodies. In The Strahlau Haul of Fish (1822, a popular piece with songs, in the Berlin patois) he gives the first example of the Berlinese farce. Ini. Ein Roman aus dem ein und zwanzigsten Jahrhundert (Ini. A novel from the 21st century, 1810) is regarded as the first German science fiction novel.

Publications 
 Geschichte eines bei Jena gefangnen preussischen Offiziers (1807)
 Ini. Ein Roman aus dem ein und zwanzigsten Jahrhundert (1810), Reprint with commentary by Ulrich Blode: Oberhaid: Utopica, 2008, 
 Das Grab der Mutter in Palermo, novel (1818)
 Die Damenhüte im Theater (1820)
 Der Stralower Fischzug, play (1821)
 Die sechzehn Ahnen des Grafen von Luftheim, family chronicle (1821)
 Spanien's Jungfrauen-Tribut an die Mauren, novel (1830)

Notes

References
 

1768 births
1832 deaths
People from Brandenburg an der Havel

People from the Margraviate of Brandenburg
German male writers
Voss family